

Clyde Peeling's Reptiland, which opened in 1964, is a zoo located in Allenwood, Pennsylvania, and specializes in reptiles and amphibians. The zoo houses mambas, cobras, vipers, pythons, and other snakes, as well as alligators, tortoises, lizards, and frogs. Reptiland has been an accredited member of the Association of Zoos and Aquariums (AZA) since 1986.

The zoo does a multi-media show about the world of reptiles and a live lecture demonstration. The zoo conducts informative tours about how a modern animal care facility is run. The zoo also teaches daily routines, animal husbandry, and venomous snake handling procedures.

Exhibits and other facilities

The  Reptile and Amphibian Gallery houses over 40 species of snakes in naturalistic habitats. In the summer, tortoises and aquatic turtles live outdoors in the gardens. 
In addition to on-site exhibitions, the zoo does traveling exhibitions, shown at museums, science centers, and zoos.

Notes

External links

Zoos in Pennsylvania
Aquaria in Pennsylvania
Tourist attractions in Union County, Pennsylvania
Buildings and structures in Union County, Pennsylvania
Zoos established in 1964
Reptile conservation organizations
1964 establishments in Pennsylvania